"Don't You Care" is a single by The Buckinghams from the album Time & Charges. The song spent 14 weeks on the Billboard Hot 100 in 1967, reaching No. 6, while reaching No. 1 in the Philippines, and No. 4 on Canada's RPM 100. It was recorded in Columbia's 16-track New York Studios.

Chart performance

Weekly singles charts

Year-end charts

References

External links
 

1967 singles
1967 songs
The Buckinghams songs
Songs written by Gary Beisbier
Songs written by Jim Holvay
Song recordings produced by James William Guercio
Columbia Records singles